The Peking Medallion, also called The Corrupt Ones, is a 1967 crime film directed by James Hill, starring Elke Sommer, Robert Stack, Nancy Kwan and Werner Peters. The film was a co-production between France, Italy and West Germany although it was shot in English. The films German-language title is Die Hölle von Macao . It was made at the Spandau Studios in Berlin with location shooting in Hong Kong. The film's sets were designed by the art directors Hans Jürgen Kiebach and Ernst Schomer.

Stack called it "a derring-do, hidden treasure stinker" which he did for the money and because he admired Hill's Born Free. "He was obviously more at home with lions," said Stack.

Synopsis
A freelance photographer discovers an ancient treasure, the Peking Medallion - which also attracts the attention of a number of criminal gangs.

Cast
 Elke Sommer as Lilly Mancini
 Robert Stack as Cliff Wilder
 Nancy Kwan as Tina
 Werner Peters as Pinto
 Christian Marquand as Jay Brandon
 Maurizio Arena as Mancini
 Richard Haller as Kua-Song
 Hans Heyde as Hugo
 Marisa Merlini as Madame Vulcano

Reception
In 1967 Tony Mastroianni's review Cleveland Press stated the film was "handsomely photographed" and merited recognition for its pace but he also criticized "unnecessarily sadistic torture sequences".

Music 
The title song, also entitled "The Corrupt Ones", was performed by Dusty Springfield. It appeared as the B-side of her US Top 40 single "I'll Try Anything" in early 1967.

References

External links
 
 
 

1967 films
1960s action adventure films
1960s action thriller films
1960s crime thriller films
French crime action films
French action adventure films
French action thriller films
French crime thriller films
German action adventure films
German crime thriller films
Italian action adventure films
Italian crime thriller films
West German films
Films set in China
Films set in Macau
Films shot at Spandau Studios
Films directed by James Hill (British director)
English-language French films
English-language German films
English-language Italian films
Constantin Film films
1960s English-language films
1960s German films
1960s Italian films
1960s French films